= Operation Unmask =

Successful international effort to catch Internet hackers in 2012

Operation Unmask was a 2012 Interpol supported international crackdown on the Anonymous hacking group. Argentina, Chile, Colombia, and Spain participated in this operation which involved the arrest or identification of 25 people on February 28, 2012. Following the arrests, Interpol′s website sustained a cyberattack.
